Thomas Henry Fitzgerald (1 December 1824 – 10 November 1888) was an Irish pioneer in sugar cane farming in the early days of the colony of Queensland, Australia. He was a politician, first in New Zealand, then in Queensland. His descendants went on to become notable names in Queensland politics, business and law. He will be best remembered for founding the town of Innisfail.

Over a varied and interesting life, Fitzgerald was a surveyor, sugar cane farmer, Superintendent, Colonial Treasurer and pioneer.

Early life
Thomas Henry Fitzgerald was born in Carrickmacross, County Monaghan, Ireland in December 1824. Fitzgerald qualified as an engineer, but like many of his compatriots of the time, he left Ireland to seek fortune elsewhere (see Irish diaspora).

New Zealand 

Fitzgerald and one of his sisters went to New Zealand in 1842 on the George Fyfe, following their brother John, who was a medical doctor. There, he trained and worked as a surveyor and achieved additional qualifications as an engineer and architect. In 1844, he purchased  in Khandallah, now a suburb of Wellington. On 2 July 1851, he married Jessie Wilson at Wellington, the oldest daughter of James Wilson of that city.

Fitzgerald designed St Joseph's Providence, a Catholic charity school for Māori girls on the grounds of the new St Mary's College in the Wellington suburb of Thorndon. The building had two storeys, 18 bedrooms, and was opened in September 1852. The building was demolished in the 1970s, and only a porch from an 1869 extension remains, which is registered by Heritage New Zealand as a Category II heritage item.

In 1853, the Fitzgeralds moved to the Hawke's Bay Region, where he surveyed the area. He had two general stores, one of them in Napier's Waghorne Street, and he built a steam flour mill in that town. Other business activities were him acting as an agent for a shipping company, for an insurance company, and buying wool.

Fitzgerald took a very active part in Hawke's Bay politics. He represented the Ahuriri electorate (Ahuriri is the Māori name for Napier) on the Wellington Provincial Council from November 1857 to November 1858. His father-in-law, James Wilson, had previously represented the Wanganui and Rangitikei electorate from October 1856 to August 1857 on the Provincial Council. Fitzgerald was instrumental in the separation of the Hawke's Bay area from the Wellington Province, and after the formation of the Hawke's Bay Province on 1 November 1858 became its first Superintendent from April 1859 to March 1861, when he resigned. At the same time, he represented the Town of Napier electorate on the Hawke's Bay Provincial Council from February 1859 to November 1861.

He represented the  electorate in the 2nd New Zealand Parliament in 1860, from 26 April to 5 November, when he apparently retired. This was the only period during which this electorate existed. In 1862, he was declared bankrupt, which led to his move to Queensland.

Queensland

In 1862, Fitzgerald moved to the colony of Queensland, Australia. He settled in Brisbane and, through his work, saw early experiments in growing sugar cane in Queensland's sub-tropical climate. In 1866, while surveying in Mackay, Queensland he established the Alexandra sugar cane plantation. Over time, he developed a further four plantations in the region. The Alexandra mill was notable as it introduced new efficiencies into sugar cane milling, making the farming of sugar cane more accessible to the small farmers who, until that point, had mainly farmed cotton and maize.

Like many pioneers, Fitzgerald juggled active interests in business, politics and professional life (as a surveyor, Fitzgerald laid out the original town survey for what would become the city of Mackay).

At the 1867 Queensland colonial election, Fitzgerald stood as a candidate in two seats: Rockhampton (election held on 27 June) and Kennedy (election held 19 July). Having won Rockhampton, he resigned Rockhampton on 30 June as he preferred to win in Kennedy. On 19 July, he won in Kennedy.

Fitzgerald was appointed Colonial Treasurer in November 1868 in the government of Charles Lilley, a post he held for three months until he resigned from that role. In June 1869, he resigned from the seat of Kennedy.

Between 1873 and 1875, Fitzgerald represented the seat of Bowen between 1873 and 1875. One of his agendas through his term was to legislate for the introduction of cheap labour for the cane fields. Fitzgerald's interest in this was very direct: times were very difficult in the industry and cheap labour was seen as an answer to the many problems in founding sugar cane plantations. The following years heaped even more misery upon him and his fellow farmers in the region, mainly in the torrential rains which brought about widespread cane rust. Fitzgerald was declared bankrupt in 1876 and had to resign his seat from Parliament, this time for ever.

Fitzgerald returned to Brisbane and to surveying, although his dreams of establishing settlements in far north Queensland had not died. With some backing from the Catholic Church (Fitzgerald was a devout Catholic), he established, in 1880, a sugarcane plantation known as Innisfail Estate (now a locality of the same name) and accompanying settlement, which later became the town of Innisfail in far north Queensland. However, despite the eventual success of the town, the early years were very trying for Fitzgerald. Weather conditions (flooding in particular) made farming difficult, sugar prices were not good (competition against bigger milling operations did not make this easier) and ultimately managing the diseases that came with new settlements in sub-tropical regions proved too much for Fitzgerald.

Later life 
Fitzgerald retired to Teneriffe in Brisbane in poor health and died there on 10 November 1888 at the age of 64. Fitzgerald was buried in Nudgee Cemetery.

Legacy 
While having varying financial success in his life (more down than up), Fitzgerald is remarked upon for his pioneering spirit – the desire to establish something greater than personal fortune despite all the failures and disappointments. For many Irish people deciding upon Australia as their new home in the world the result was often similar. What Fitzgerald saw was the future – a rich and fertile far north Queensland that could house many people and feed even more. The areas he surveyed, from the Daintree down to Tully, are now some of the world's most desirable tourist locations and most productive farm lands.

He took the first difficult steps in showing people that the land could be farmed well. The rush that ensued, particularly encouraged by the successful methods of the Alexandra mill, established an entire industry and led to the growth of a strong economy in north Queensland.

Innisfail was originally the name for Fitzgerald's own property. The Surveyor-General called the town Geraldton, in Fitzgerald's honour, in 1882. However, a Russian ship bound for Geraldton in Western Australia arrived at the port to collect a load of Jarrah wood. This would be the equivalent of a ship sailing up the Potomac River to Washington, D.C. to collect trees from the forests of Washington state. A public meeting was held in 1910 and the name of the town was officially changed to Innisfail. A school in North Mackay is also named in his honour.

Another success which he did not live to see was that of his children and their descendants. In his immediate family of 11, most notable was Charles Borromeo Fitzgerald, who held the seat of Mitchell from 1896 to 1902 and was appointed Attorney-General in the short-lived Labor government under Anderson Dawson—the first Labor government in the world. Ironically, the Labor Party was one of the primary drivers of the White Australia policy, looking to stop the influx of foreign labour into the Australian economy (in particular the sugar cane farms of north Queensland). In subsequent generations, the scions of the Thomas Henry Fitzgerald family would establish themselves in business, law (the succeeding generations of lawyers named James Francis Fitzgerald), education, the clergy and the military.

Here and there are other little legacies of Fitzgerald—the place name of Te Kowai in Queensland was named by Fitzgerald after the flower of the same name he first saw in New Zealand as a younger man.

Notes

References

External links 

  — the history of Fitzgerald's involvement in sugar growing in Innisfail

|-

|-

|-

1824 births
1888 deaths
19th-century Irish people
New Zealand Roman Catholics
People from County Monaghan
People from County Kerry
Settlers of Australia
People from Central Queensland
Members of the New Zealand House of Representatives
Members of the Queensland Legislative Assembly
Superintendents of New Zealand provincial councils
History of sugar
People from Innisfail, Queensland
Treasurers of Queensland
Irish expatriates in Australia
Irish emigrants to New Zealand (before 1923)
Australian people of Irish descent
Burials at Nudgee Cemetery
New Zealand MPs for North Island electorates
19th-century Australian politicians
19th-century New Zealand politicians
Australian Roman Catholics